Oksana Kukhta (née Herhel, born June 20, 1994 in Ivanychi) is a Ukrainian freestyle wrestler of Spartak sports club.

Career
She is 2015 World Champion and silver medalist of the European Championships 2016.

In May 2016, she was provisionally suspended due to use of meldonium. Later that decision was reverted.

References

External links
 
 
 
 
 
 

1994 births
Living people
Ukrainian female sport wrestlers
Olympic wrestlers of Ukraine
Wrestlers at the 2016 Summer Olympics
World Wrestling Championships medalists
Sportspeople from Lviv
Doping cases in wrestling
Ukrainian sportspeople in doping cases
European Wrestling Championships medalists
21st-century Ukrainian women